Dieudonné Londo (born 6 June 1976) is a former Gabon international football forward who played for clubs in Gabon, Morocco, Belgium, Greece and Cyprus.

Career
Born in Libreville, Londo began playing football for local side FC 105 Libreville. He had a spell in Morocco where he played for Raja Casablanca before moving to Europe. He joined Belgian Pro League club R.A.E.C. Mons for five seasons, and then joined Super League Greece side Akratitos F.C. in July 2005.

Londo would later play for Cypriot club Digenis Morphou before finishing his career in Belgium with U.R.S. du Centre.

International career
He has played 34 international matches and scored 11 for Gabon.

References

External links

Profile at Guardian's Stats Centre

1976 births
Living people
Gabonese footballers
Gabonese expatriate footballers
Gabon international footballers
2000 African Cup of Nations players
Association football forwards
Raja CA players
R.A.E.C. Mons players
A.P.O. Akratitos Ano Liosia players
Digenis Akritas Morphou FC players
UR La Louvière Centre players
Super League Greece players
Belgian Pro League players
Cypriot First Division players
Expatriate footballers in Morocco
Expatriate footballers in Cyprus
Expatriate footballers in Greece
Expatriate footballers in Belgium
Gabonese expatriate sportspeople in Belgium
21st-century Gabonese people